Anne Dixon may refer to:

Anne Dixon (costume designer); see Genie Award for Best Achievement in Costume Design
Anne Dixon, Miss Illinois Teen USA
Anne Dixon, character in Cuckoo (TV series)

See also
Ann Dixon (disambiguation)
Anne Dickson, Northern Ireland politician